Thomas Herrin Walters (born June 11, 1942) is a former American football safety who played professionally in the National Football League (NFL) for the Washington Redskins from 1964 to 1967. Walters played college football for the University of Southern Mississippi.

References

External links
 

1942 births
Living people
American football safeties
Pearl River Wildcats football players
Southern Miss Golden Eagles football players
Washington Redskins players
People from Petal, Mississippi
Players of American football from Mississippi